Cutthroat Kitchen is a reality cooking television show hosted by Alton Brown. It premiered on August 11, 2013, on Food Network, and features four chefs competing in a three-round elimination cooking competition.  The contestants face auctions in which they can purchase opportunities to sabotage one another. Each chef is given $25,000 at the start of the show; the person left standing keeps whatever money they have not spent in the auctions. The show is in its fifteenth season as of June 2017.

Series overview

Episodes

Season 1

Season 2

Season 3

Season 4

Season 5

Season 6

Season 7

Season 8

Season 9

Season 10

Season 11

Season 12
Richard Blais became a new recurring judge in Season 12.

Season 13

Season 14

Season 15

Australian airings

References

Lists of American non-fiction television series episodes